"Reload" is a song by Swedish house producer Sebastian Ingrosso and Australian producer Tommy Trash. The original mix, written and produced by Sebastian Ingrosso and Tommy Trash, was released by Sebastian Ingrosso's label Refune Records on September 29, 2012. It was included on Ingrosso's group Swedish House Mafia's compilation album Until Now. A version featuring vocals from Swedish singer John Martin was released the following year.

Charts

Vocal Version

The vocal mix features vocals from Swedish singer John Martin.

Track listing

Charts

Year-end charts

Certifications

Release history

References 

2012 singles
2013 singles
John Martin (singer) songs
House music songs
Songs written by Sebastian Ingrosso
Number-one singles in Scotland
Songs written by Michel Zitron
Songs written by Vincent Pontare
Songs written by John Martin (singer)
Songs written by Adam Baptiste
Sebastian Ingrosso songs
Song recordings produced by Sebastian Ingrosso